Tsing Yi Swimming Pool is a public swimming pool on Tsing Yi Island, New Territories, Hong Kong. It is near the east shore of the island, between Maritime Square and Tsing Yi Sports Ground. Currently, it is managed by the Leisure and Cultural Services Department of Hong Kong Government.

History
The swimming pool was built and planned at the same time as the adjacent Tsing Yi Sports Ground. Both facilities were designed by the Architectural Services Department and planned by the former Regional Council. The site was also supposed to accommodate an indoor recreation centre, but it was thought that the development would be too cramped and so the centre was deleted from the plans in 1992.

The pool complex was designed with a capacity of 1,000 swimmers. It opened on 30 September 1996.

Facilities
 Main pool
 Teaching pool
 Leisure pool with water slides
 Spectator stand (covered, 974 seats)

References

External links

1996 establishments in Hong Kong
Swimming venues in Hong Kong
Tsing Yi